Vranov nad Topľou (Slovak before 1927 and from 1944–1969: Vranov;  / Vronau an der Töpl (rare);) is a city of approximately 22,500 inhabitants in eastern Slovakia, situated near Košice and Prešov, and between the Topľa River and the Ondava River.

Parts: Vranov nad Topľou (proper); Čemerné; Lomnica

Etymology
The name is derived from a Slovak word vrana (crow) with a possessive suffix -ov. In Latin medieval record, the settlement is often called Varanno (the Hungarized form), but also Wrano, Varanow or rarely Varanovia (the Latinized form).

Location
Vranov nad Toplou occupies the northwest bulge of the Eastern Slovak Lowland (Východoslovenská nížina) in the upper part of the region called Zemplín between the rivers Topľa and Ondava.

History
The earliest evidences of the human presence in the area of today's Vranov dates back to Paleolithic Era. Several artefacts from the Roman-Migration Period were unearth in the center of town. Extensive Slavic settlement (7th-10th century) existed in Lomnica (nowadays a part of Vranov), Slavic settlements are known also from Čemerné and other localities.

The first written mention about Vranov dates back to 1332–1337, but mentions about localities that are nowadays parts of town are older (1229, 1270, 1282). The medieval settlement of Vranov nad Topľou was part of the castle estate Čičva (Csisva) which was built in 1310. Because of the advantageous geographical position of the town situated on the important trading path leading from Eperjes/Prešov, Vranov nad Topľou became an economic and social centre for the territory in the basin of two rivers, the Ondava and the Topľa. Besides the local trade, handicraft production has been developed here, too.

Vranov was granted town status probably before 1363 (in this year it was firstly mentioned as "civitas"). The heads of the municipal government founded were the mayor and the counselors. The town was given more municipal privileges (toll right, right to store the goods, right to hold an annual market) by  King Matthias Corvinus in 1461, and the town was given the right to make out written documents with a municipal seal. The original seal from the 15th century displayed a cancer, later it was replaced by a patron of the local church (King Saint Stephen). The heraldic coat-of-arms in its present form has been used since 1622. The first guilds were founded here in the 16th century. The guild of Vranov shoemakers is one of the oldest guilds in the whole Zemplín county. A grammar school was founded in the town in the 16th century.

When a large part of Hungary was conquered by the Turks in 1526, Vranov was mostly unaffected as the northern regions of Hungary were not conquered by the Turks and this allowed the city to prosper under the Zápolya house which ruled the area and the Thököly's in the late 17th century.

In the second half of the 19th century, Vranov nad Topľou became the centre of a region of 44 villages. At the end of the century there was mass emigration. In 1903, Vranov got access to the railroad; electric lighting and the telephone were introduced in 1906.

After the formation of Czechoslovakia, the Hungarian name Varanno was changed to Vranov nad Topľou and it remained a small agrarian and craft town. During the Second World War, some partisan groups were formed in the region, and the town became the centre of an anti-fascist revolt. In 1942 most of the remaining Hungarians, those who would not declare that they were ethnic Slovaks, were forcibly deported from Vranov and ethnic Slovaks were moved into the area. The period after 1945 was a time of industrial development, building of housing estates and reconstruction of the town centre.

Demographics
According to the 2001 census, the town had 22,985 inhabitants. 93.11% of inhabitants were Slovaks, 4.40% Roma, 0.61% Czechs, 0.27% Rusyns and 0.25% Ukrainian. The religious makeup was 62.61% Roman Catholics, 20.13% Greek Catholics, 7.18% Lutherans and 5.70% people with no religious affiliation.

Noteworthy objects
The town features a Gothic church from the 15th century (rebuilt 1578 and again 1718), a baroque monastery from 1718, a neo-Gothic Evangelic Lutheran church of 1930-1935 and a Reformed church from the early 20th century. A synagogue of 1923 and a classicist manor house (a castle built in the 18th century on the place of a castle built in the Middle Ages) were demolished in the 1980s. Vranov was also a major milling centre during the 16th century.

The town is the starting point for trips to the Veľká Domaša water reservoir.

The town is an economic center of the surroundings. In the late 20th century it housed chemical (Bukóza works), clothing (Slovenka), building materials and food industries.

Sports

MFK Vranov nad Topľou
The city has one football club, MFK Vranov nad Topľou, which competes in the Slovak Third League (East), the third-tier of Slovak football.

Notable people
Ján Figeľ, the first European Commissioner for Slovakia, currently the leader of the Christian Democratic Movement party.
Vladimír Kobielsky, actor
Vojtech Christov, football referee
Matus Tomko, opera singer

Twin towns — sister cities

Vranov nad Topľou is twinned with:

 Bystřice nad Pernštejnem, Czech Republic
 Dynów, Poland 
 Sambir, Ukraine
 Vynohradiv, Ukraine
 Mád, Hungary

References

External links
 
 

Cities and towns in Slovakia